We Live in Cairo is a musical following the 2011 Egyptian revolution (part of the wider Arab Spring) and its aftermath. The show's book, music, and lyrics were written by Lebanese-American brothers Daniel and Patrick Lazour.

Production 
The show was inspired by a 2011 photograph taken by Ed Ou for The New York Times of young Egyptian activists looking at a computer screen. The first draft of the show was being written as the protests were happening, and ended with Hosni Mubarak's ousting from power. However, as events continued to unfold, the Lazour brothers decided the show needed to include the aftermath of the protests as well. The brothers were eventually able to meet with some Egyptian activists to gain more insight for the show, including Wael Ghonim and Ganzeer, who created the poster art for the show.

The show had its first reading at Colombia University. In 2015 the production had a residency at the Eugene O'Neill Theatre Center's National Music Conference.

The show was part of the National Alliance for Musical Theatre's Festival of New Musicals in 2016. At the time the show was a single act. That same year the show had a residency at the American Repertory Theater. The show was workshopped at American University in Cairo in 2017. The show also had a staged reading at the New York Theatre Workshop in April of that year.

The show premiered on in 2019 at the American Repertory Theater's Loeb Drama Center. Previews began 14 May, with opening night on 22 May. The show was directed by Taibi Magar and choreographed by Samar Haddad King. The production used projections to create outdoor scenes and to show actual social media posts, footage, and photographs from the 2011 protests.

Plot

Act l 
The show begins with the actors teaching the audience a protest song ("Genealogy of Revolution").

Six young Egyptian students from the American University in Cairo (Amir, Fadwa, Hany, Hassan, Karim, and Layla) meet in a warehouse to discuss demonstration tactics ("Loud Voice"). Layla takes photographs in Cairo and notices the poverty around her ("Cairo Street Scenes"). After a student is killed by the Egyptian police, the six take to the streets and to social media to protest ("Flap My Wings"). Karim goes out one night to paint a mural in support of the protesters ("Wall Song").

Amir, a Christian, falls for Layla, who is Muslim. He composes a song for her ("Movement"). Amir later finishes a song he has been working on to inspire his friends, and plays it for them ("Tahrir is Now").

The act ends with the students protesting at Tahrir Square and Egyptian president Hosni Mubarak being ousted from power ("The 18 Days").

Act ll 
Mohammed Morsi is elected to power. Hany believes the results of the free election should be respected, while Fadwa disagrees, thinking Morsi is just as much of a tyrant as Mubarak. Hassan's connections to the Muslim Brotherhood cause further conflict. Disagreements splinter the group, with Hany moving to New York City to attend law school.

Amir is killed in Rabaa Square during a protest. Hany returns to Egypt but is arrested, along with Fadwa. Layla visits Hany in prison, where she reaffirms her commitment to not only survive in Cairo, but to live in Cairo ("Living Here").

Characters 
Amir – a Coptic Christian songwriter and guitar player who is Hany's brother. He falls in love with Layla.

Fadwa – a "firebrand" activist who spent time in prison for a previous protest. 

Hany – Amir's brother, a Copt songwriter and aspring lawyer, who is less enthusiastic about the potential relationship between his brother and Layla.

Hassan –  a graffiti propagandist with family connections to the Muslim Brotherhood

Karim – a graffiti propagandist who is a mentor to and attracted to Hassan

Layla – a Muslim photographer who is in love with Amir

Music 
The 2019 production had a band with seven musicians (Madeline Smith, Naseem Alatrash, Kate Foss, Bengisu Gökçe, Nacho González Nappa, Ghassan Sawalhi, Jeremy Smith) playing doumbek, hand drums, guitar, oud, and strings. The show's music was characterized as mixing punk, traditional Middle Eastern music, and 1960s folk music. The Lazours have cited Sayed Darwish, Ramy Essam, Fairuz, Umm Kulthum, and Sheikh Imam as musical influences.

Flap My Wings: Songs from We Live in Cairo 
On 25 January 2021 the Lazours released "Flap My Wings: Songs from We Live in Cairo", an album of songs from the show. The songs were largely recorded not by the original cast, but by the Lazours and by popular Arab musicians. "Flap My Wings" and "Genealogy of Revolution" were released as singles prior to the album's release. The album does not present the songs in the order they appear in in the show. 

Track listing:

 Genealogy of Revolution (Hamed Sinno)
 Wall Song (Hadi Eldebeck)
 Cairo Street Scenes (Rotana)
 Movement (Jakeim Hart, Parisa Shahmir)
 Loud Voice (Haboya, Mohamed Araki, Mohamed Sharhabil)
 Flap My Wings (The Lazours)
 Living Here (Emel Mathlouthi)
 Each & Every Name (Naseem Alatrash)
 The 18 Days, Pt. 1 (In the Morning) (Original cast)
 The 18 Days, Pt. 2 (A Million People) (Original cast)
 The 18 Days, Pt. 3 (Our Square) (Original cast)
 Tahrir is Now (Ramy Essam)
 Dreaming Words (Demo) (The Lazours)

Cast

Reception 
The 2019 production saw mostly positive reviews from Arab Stages, the Boston Herald, GBH, New York Stage Review, New England Theatre Geek, and TwoCircles. The show received mixed to negative reviews from the Arts Fuse, The Boston Globe, and The Theatre Times. Several reviews felt the show needed a more intimate space than the Loeb Drama Center.

Awards 

 2016: Richard Rodgers Award for Musical Theatre

References 

2019 musicals
American musicals
Musicals inspired by real-life events
Plays set in the 21st century
Plays set in Egypt
Works about the Arab Spring